This is a list of film and television roles for Ken Jeong, an American comedian and actor.

Film

Television

Music videos

References 

Male actor filmographies
American filmographies